The Asolo Repertory Theatre or Asolo Rep (AKA: Asolo Theatre Company, Inc.) is a professional theater in Sarasota, Florida. It is the largest Equity theatre in Florida, and the largest Repertory theatre in the Southeastern United States. Asolo Rep is a resident regional theatre company which also invites in guest artists. It works in conjunction with Florida State University's MFA Acting program, the FSU/Asolo Conservatory for Actor Training. It is currently housed in the Florida State University Center for the Performing Arts, which is a multi-theater complex, located on the John and Mable Ringling Museum of Art property. The 2008–2009 season marked Asolo Rep's 50th anniversary.

History of the Historic Asolo Theatre

The original performance space for the Asolo Repertory Theatre was housed in a historic theatre that was initially located in Asolo, Italy in province of Treviso, fifty kilometers North West of Venice. Commissioned in 1798 by Italian impresario Antonio Locatelli, the theatre stood in the former audience hall of the castle of Caterina Cornaro, the former Queen of Cyprus. The horse-shoe shaped theatre contains four tiers of boxes and was modeled after La Fenice. In the late 19th and early 20th centuries the building was the home theatre of the great Italian actress Eleonora Duse.

In 1930, the Asolo Theatre was dismantled and put into storage. In 1949 the museum director of the John and Mable Ringling Museum of Art learned of the theatre's existence and saw the theatre as an ideal acquisition for the museum. The State of Florida agreed and purchased the theatre which was crated and shipped to Sarasota, Florida. In 1952 the theatre was set up in a gallery in the Ringling museum. In the late 1950s it was decided that the theatre should be reconstructed so that modern theatre performances could be staged. The reconstructed theatre therefore incorporates the historic architecture into a building that is modern in design.

The Asolo Theatre opened its doors on January 10, 1958, with a production of Wolfgang Amadeus Mozart's Die Entführung aus dem Serail. Presented by the New York City Opera, the production was directed and conducted by Julius Rudel. The opera starred Robert Rounseville as Belmonte, Beverly Bower as Konstanze, Herbert Beattle as Osmin, and Jacquelynne Moody as Blonde.

The theatre has since been moved to another location on the Ringling grounds and is now known as The Historic Asolo Theatre. The Asolo Repertory Company still puts on a few productions there each year, but it is no longer its primary location. Most shows for the Rep Company are performed at the Mertz Theatre, which is housed in the Florida State University Center for the Performing Arts, which is across the street. In addition, the Rep Company collaborates with other theater companies in the South, such as Miami New Drama at the Colony Theatre.

History of the Mertz Theatre
The Harold E. and Esther M. Mertz Theatre was brought to America from Scotland, where it had existed as the Dunfermline Opera House. The Mertz Theatre was dedicated on January 27, 1990. The 2009–2010 season marked its twentieth anniversary, which was to be celebrated with a Scottish-themed event in January.

Artists
The Asolo has engaged a collection of talented artists throughout the years, including all those listed below.

Actors
 James Stacy Barbour
 Wendy Barrie-Wilson
 Mimi Bessette
 Deanna Dunagan
 Wayne Duvall
 Linda Eder
 Rob Evan
 Richard Falklen
 Hershey Felder
 Kelsey Fowler
 Anthony Heald
 Donald C. Hepner
 Polly Holliday
 Jayne Houdyshell
 Tom Hulce
 Jeremy Jordan
 Ann Morrison
 Brad Oscar
 Laura Osnes
 John G. Preston
 Paul Reubens
 Jessica Rush
 Natalie Toro
 Melissa van der Schyff
 Granville Van Dusen
 Chuck Wagner
 Elizabeth Ward

Directors
 Jeff Calhoun
 Warren Carlyle
 Brad Dalton
 Keith Fowler
 Frank Galati
 Lillian Garrett-Groag
 Gordon Greenberg
 Tony Walton

Designers
 Howell Binkley
 Matthew Parker
 Richard Pilbrow
 Eduardo Sicangco
 Tony Walton
 Robert Wierzel

Other artists
 Nilo Cruz
 Steven Drukman
 John McDaniel
 Lynn Nottage
 Frank Wildhorn

See also
 Florida State University/Asolo Conservatory for Actor Training

References

Asolo Rep Announces 51st Season Lineup 03/09/09

External links
Asolo Repertory Theatre official website

Florida State University
League of Resident Theatres
Regional theatre in the United States
Theatres in Florida
Theatre companies in Florida
Culture of Sarasota, Florida
Tourist attractions in Sarasota County, Florida